Carl Deal is an American documentary filmmaker and journalist. He is the producer and director of the films Trouble the Water and Citizen Koch, producer of Michael Moore's Where To Invade Next and Fahrenheit 11/9, and co-producer of Capitalism: A Love Story and Fahrenheit 9/11.

Career
Carl Deal directed and produced, together with Tia Lessin, the Oscar-nominated documentary Trouble the Water, their feature debut. The film, which chronicles one remarkable couple’s survival of Hurricane Katrina and their journey in its aftermath, was also honored with the 2008 Sundance Grand Jury Prize, and named Best Documentary Feature at the Full Frame Festival and the IFP/Gotham Independent Film Awards.

A longtime collaborator of director Michael Moore, Deal produced the anti-Trump epic Fahrenheit 11/9, which opened in September 2018 on over 1800 screens in the US, the widest theatrical opening of any documentary to date. He previously produced Moore's Where To Invade Next, and co-produced Capitalism: A Love Story. He has contributed to many other films.

Previously, as a broadcast news producer and journalist, Deal reported throughout the US, Latin America and in Iraq. He is a graduate of Columbia University's journalism school, which awarded him its social justice prize, and has written investigative reports on environmental, civil and criminal justice for Greenpeace, Amnesty International and Public Citizen.

Deal and his partner and collaborator, Tia Lessin, live and work in Brooklyn, New York.

Films
 Fahrenheit 11/9 (2018), producer
 Michael Moore In Trumpland (2016), producer
 Where To Invade Next (2015), producer
 Citizen Koch (2013), director & producer
 Capitalism: A Love Story (2009), co-producer
 Trouble the Water (2008), director & producer
 The War on Democracy (2007), archival producer
 Fahrenheit 9/11 (2004), co-producer
 Bowling for Columbine (2002), archival producer

References

External links

Trouble the Water Official Site

American film producers
American documentary film directors
American documentary film producers
Living people
Year of birth missing (living people)